Lampman Hill is a mountain in Greene County, New York. It is located in the Catskill Mountains southeast of Coxsackie. High Rocks is located north-northwest, and Flint Mine Hill is located west-southwest of Lampman Hill.

References

Mountains of Greene County, New York
Mountains of New York (state)